Chatursinh Javanji Chavda (born 29 March 1958) is an Indian politician and was member of Gujarat Legislative Assembly. He was the president of Gujarat Pradesh Congress Committee. Also, he served the party as head of Gandhinagar District Congress Committee.

He was elected from Gandhinagar North assembly constituency in 2017 Gujarat Legislative Assembly election. He contested 2019 Indian general election from Gandhinagar and was defeated.

He was elected from Vijapur Assembly constituency in 2022 Gujarat Legislative Assembly election as a INC candidate defeating his nearest rival and Bharatiya Janata Party candidate Ramanbhai Patel.

References

External links
 http://myneta.info/Gujarat2017/candidate.php?candidate_id=5406

1968 births
Living people
Gujarat MLAs 2017–2022
Gujarat MLAs 2022–2027
Indian National Congress politicians from Gujarat